Sebastián Martínez Vidrio (born 6 January 2001) is a Mexican professional footballer who plays as a forward. He was included in The Guardian's "Next Generation 2018".

Career statistics

Club

References

External links
Sebastián Martínez Vidrio at Liga MX 
 
 

2001 births
Living people
Mexican footballers
Mexico youth international footballers
Association football forwards
C.D. Guadalajara footballers
Tercera División de México players
Footballers from Veracruz
People from Coatzacoalcos